Pollenia ruficrura is a species of cluster fly in the family Polleniidae.

Distribution
France, Italy, Morocco.

References

Polleniidae
Insects described in 1862
Diptera of Africa
Diptera of Europe
Taxa named by Camillo Rondani